Elim Airport  is a state-owned, public-use airport located three nautical miles (6 km) southwest of the central business district of Elim, a city in the Nome Census Area of the U.S. state of Alaska.

This airport is included in the FAA's National Plan of Integrated Airport Systems for 2009–2013, where it is listed as commercial service - non-primary, an FAA category for airports with 2,500 to 10,000 passenger boardings (enplanements) per year. However, Federal Aviation Administration records for calendar year 2008 categorized it as general aviation based on 2,356 enplanements that year, a decrease of 26.1% from the 3,189 enplanements in 2007.

Facilities 
It has one runway designated 1/19 with a gravel surface measuring 3,401 by 60 feet (1,037 x 18 m).

Airlines and destinations 

Prior to its bankruptcy and cessation of all operations, Ravn Alaska served the airport from multiple locations.

Statistics

References

External links 
 Alaska FAA airport diagram (GIF)
 Resources for this airport:
 
 
 

Airports in the Nome Census Area, Alaska